Good News (Spanish:Buenas noticias) is a 1954 Spanish comedy film directed by Eduardo Manzanos Brochero.

Cast
 José Alburquerque 
 Manuel Arbó 
 Xan das Bolas 
 Dolores Bremón 
 Faustino Bretaño 
 José Capilla 
 Federico Chacón 
 Juan Domenech 
 Llebe Donay 
 El Chirri 
 Máximo Ferrero 
 Antonio Fornis 
 María Luz Galicia 
 María de la Rosa 
 Julio Montijano 
 Antonio Moreno 
 Conchita Muñoz 
 Francisco Nuño 
 José Luis Ozores 
 Teófilo Palou
 Miguel Pastor 
 José Manuel Ramirez 
 Joaquín Regález 
 José G. Rey 
 Matilde Roldán 
 Cándido Sol

References

Bibliography 
 Bentley, Bernard. A Companion to Spanish Cinema. Boydell & Brewer 2008.

External links 
 

1954 comedy films
Spanish comedy films
1954 films
1950s Spanish-language films
Spanish black-and-white films
1950s Spanish films